My Horse Likes You is the second studio album by Berlin-based indie punk band Bonaparte. It was released by Staatsakt label in 2010, two years after the release of their first album, Too Much. The whole album was recorded by Tobias Jundt in the pantry of his berlin apartment.

Track listing
All songs written by Tobias Jundt except where noted.
"Ouverture" (T. Jundt, G. F. Handel) – 2:51
"My Horse Likes You" – 3:16
"Computer in Love" – 3:46
"Boycott Everything" – 3:17
"L'état c'est moi" – 3:40
"Fly a Plane Into Me" (T. Jundt, J. Suske) – 4:12
"Rave Rave Rave" (T. Jundt, M. Jeger) – 3:46
"Intermission in Mexico" (Traditional, lyrics by Minski Wellington) – 1:49
"технология" – 3:40
"Wir sind keine Menschen" – 4:03
"My Body Is a Battlefield" – 4:17
"Orangutang" (feat. Modeselektor) (T. Jundt, S. Szary) – 4:59
"Adabmal" – 4:54
"The End" – 1:17

Notes
The CD version includes a hidden track after one minute of silence in "The End", making the track last 3:28.
The vinyl version includes an extended version of "Ouverture" (lasting 3:52) and replaces "The End" for the bonus track "This War" (4:37). It was released in two editions: double white vinyl and double black vinyl.
The digital download version renames track 9 as "Technologiya".
The iTunes version includes the video for "Computer in Love" and a digital booklet.

References

2010 albums
Bonaparte (band) albums